Kiuchi Sōgorō , also known as Sakura Sōgorō (1605 – September 1653) was a legendary Japanese farmer whose real family name was Kiuchi. He is said to have appealed directly to the shōgun in 1652 when he was serving as a headman of one of the villages in the Sakura Domain. In the appeal he requested the shōgun to help ease the peasants' burden of heavy taxes and bad crops. But since direct appeals were illegal in those days, he was arrested. It is widely believed that he was executed (crucified) along with his sons (and some sources claim also his wife) in 1653 by the daimyō of his feudal domain. However, no evidence for the existence of the incident has been found, although a farmer named Sōgorō was found listed on the record of the village. The legend of Sakura Sōgorō has been made into numerous stories and plays of kabuki, Jōruri, and so on (a.o. a play called "Self-Sacrificing Man Sakura Sōgo"). In 1851 the play was first staged at Nakamura-za. He is enshrined in Sōgo-reidō of Tōshōji temple in Narita city. He was praised by Fukuzawa Yukichi and in the Freedom and People's Rights Movement and is still admired by many as gimin (martyr, in the non-religious sense). Every year on 2 September (it is said that it is the day before his execution, but other sources say he was executed on the 24th), there are all-night gatherings in memory of Sōgo-sama at the Sōgo Reidō Sanctuary (Tōshōji Temple) in Narita (Chiba prefecture).

Media
In Persona 5, the character Sojiro Sakura's name was inspired by Sōgorō.

See also

Japanese Castles of Edo Period

Bibliography

References

External links
 Sogo Reido Sanctuary (Toshoji Temple) in Narita
 Sogo Reido Sanctuary on chiba-tour.jp
 
 
 
 

People of Edo-period Japan
People from Chiba Prefecture
1605 births
1653 deaths